Domingos António de Sequeira (Lisbon; 10 March 1768Rome; 8 March 1837) was a famous Portuguese painter at the Royal Court of King John VI of Portugal.

Biography
He was born in Belém, Lisbon, into a modest family. He later changed his family name from Espírito Santo to the more aristocratic Sequeira. He studied art first at the academy of Lisbon, before moving to Rome, where he was Antonio Cavallucci`s pupil.

By the age of thirteen, he had evinced such marked talent that F. de Setubal employed him as an assistant in his work for the João Ferreiras Palace. Sequeira resided in Rome from 1788 to 1794, when he was made honorary member of the Academy of St Luke. After another two years and further study in Italy, he returned to his native country with such a great reputation that important commissions for churches and palaces were immediately entrusted to him: scriptural subjects, large historical compositions and cabinet pictures.

In 1802, he was appointed first court painter and, in this role, executed many works for the prince regent, for Dona Maria Teresa, and for members of the court. He designed the valuable silver service which was presented by the Portuguese nation to Wellington, and a monument that was erected in 1820 in the Rossio square at Lisbon. In 1823, he visited Paris where he is known to have tried his skill in lithography and etching. In 1825, he painted the "Death of Camões", which was considered by many to be the first proto-romantic or romantic Portuguese painting.

The last years of his life he spent in Rome, devoting himself chiefly to devotional subjects and to his duties as head of the Portuguese Academy. He saw a Turner exposition in the late 1820s, that served as inspiration for some of his best paintings, like his Adoration of the Magi (1828). He died in Rome in 1837.

Works
Among his best-known pictures are the Miracle of Ourique, Prince John Reviewing the Troops at Azumbuja, and The Adoration of the Magi. Numerous paintings by Sequeira are held at the Mafra National Palace, the Ajuda National Palace, and in the principal palaces and churches of Lisbon. The Museu Nacional de Arte Antiga (National Museum of Ancient Art), in Lisbon, has one of the best collections of his paintings.

Gallery

References

 Scholarly articles in English bout Domingos António de Sequeira both in web and PDF @ the Spanish Old Masters Gallery
 Palácio Nacional da Ajuda

Sources
 José-Augusto França, A Arte em Portugal no Século XIX, Lisboa, Bertrand Editora, 1991, volume 1.

1768 births
1837 deaths
Portuguese neoclassical painters
Portuguese Roman Catholics
People from Lisbon
Painters at the Portuguese royal court
18th-century Portuguese painters
18th-century male artists
Portuguese male painters
19th-century Portuguese painters
19th-century male artists